Sir Henry Raeburn  (4 March 1756 – 8 July 1823) was a Scottish portrait painter. He served as Portrait Painter to King George IV in Scotland.

Biography

Raeburn was born the son of a manufacturer in Stockbridge, on the Water of Leith: a former village now within the city of Edinburgh. He had an older brother, born in 1744, called William Raeburn. His ancestors were believed to have been soldiers, and may have taken the name "Raeburn" from a hill farm in Annandale, held by Sir Walter Scott's family. Orphaned, he was supported by William and placed in Heriot's Hospital, where he received an education. At the age of fifteen he was apprenticed to the goldsmith James Gilliland of Edinburgh, and various pieces of jewellery, mourning rings and the like, adorned with minute drawings on ivory by his hand, still exist. When the medical student Charles Darwin died in 1778, his friend and professor Andrew Duncan took a lock of his student's hair to the jeweller whose apprentice, Raeburn, made a memorial locket.

Soon he took to the production of carefully finished portrait miniatures; meeting with success and patronage, he extended his practice to oil painting, at which he was self-taught. Gilliland watched the progress of his pupil with interest, and introduced him to David Martin, who had been the favourite assistant of Allan Ramsay the Latter, and was now the leading portrait painter in Edinburgh. Raeburn was especially aided by the loan of portraits to copy. Soon he had gained sufficient skill to make him decide to devote himself exclusively to painting. George Chalmers (1776; Dunfermline Town Hall) is his earliest known portrait.

In his early twenties, Raeburn was asked to paint the portrait of a young lady he had noticed when he was sketching from nature in the fields. Ann was the daughter of Peter Edgar of Bridgelands, and widow of Count James Leslie of Deanhaugh. Fascinated by the handsome and intellectual young artist, she became his wife within a month, bringing him an ample fortune. The acquisition of wealth did not affect his enthusiasm or his industry, but spurred him on to acquire a thorough knowledge of his craft. It was usual for artists to visit Italy, and Raeburn set off with his wife. In London he was kindly received by Sir Joshua Reynolds, the president of the Royal Academy, who advised him on what to study in Rome, especially recommending the works of Michelangelo, and gave Raeburn letters of introduction for Italy. In Rome he met his fellow Scot Gavin Hamilton, Pompeo Girolamo Batoni and Byers, an antique dealer whose advice proved particularly useful, especially the recommendation that "he should never copy an object from memory, but, from the principal figure to the minutest accessory, have it placed before him." After two years of study in Italy he returned to Edinburgh in 1787, and began a successful career as a portrait painter. In that year he executed a seated portrait of the second Lord President Dundas.

Examples of his earlier portraiture include a bust of Mrs Johnstone of Baldovie and a three-quarter-length of Dr James Hutton: works which, if somewhat timid and tentative in handling and not as confident as his later work, nevertheless have delicacy and character. The portraits of John Clerk, Lord Eldin, and of Principal Hill of St Andrews belong to a later period. Raeburn was fortunate in the time in which he practised portraiture. Sir Walter Scott, Hugh Blair, Henry Mackenzie, Lord Woodhouselee, William Robertson, John Home, Robert Fergusson, and Dugald Stewart were resident in Edinburgh, and were all painted by Raeburn. Mature works include his own portrait and that of the Rev. Sir Henry Moncrieff Wellwood, a bust of Dr Wardrop of Torbane Hill, two full-lengths of Adam Rolland of Gask, the remarkable paintings of Lord Newton and Dr Alexander Adam in the National Gallery of Scotland, and that of William Macdonald of St Martin's. Apart from himself, Raeburn painted only two artists, one of whom was Sir Francis Leggatt Chantrey, the most important and famous British sculptor of the first half of the 19th century. It has recently been revealed that Raeburn and Chantrey were close friends and that Raeburn took exceptional care over the execution of his portrait of the sculptor, one of the painter's mature bust-length masterpieces.

It was commonly believed that Raeburn was less successful in painting female portraits, but the exquisite full-length of his wife, the smaller likeness of Mrs R. Scott Moncrieff in the National Gallery of Scotland, and that of Mrs Robert Bell, and others, argue against this. Raeburn spent his life in Edinburgh, rarely visiting London, and then only for brief periods, thus preserving his individuality. Although he, personally, may have lost advantages resulting from closer association with the leaders of English art, and from contact with a wider public, Scottish art gained much from his disinclination to leave his native land. He became the acknowledged chief of the school which was growing up in Scotland during the early 19th century, and his example and influence at a critical period were of major importance. So varied were his other interests that sitters used to say of him, "You would never take him for a painter till he seizes the brush and palette."

In 1812 he was elected president of the Society of Artists in Edinburgh; and in 1814 associate, and in the following year full member, of the Royal Scottish Academy. On 29 August 1822 he received a knighthood during the visit of King George IV to Scotland and appointed His Majesty's limner for Scotland at the Earl of Hopetoun house. He died in Edinburgh not long after on 8 July 1823.

Raeburn had all the essential qualities of a popular and successful portrait painter. He was able to produce a telling and forcible likeness; his work is distinguished by powerful characterisation, stark realism, dramatic and unusual lighting effects, and swift and broad handling of the most resolute sort. David Wilkie recorded that, while travelling in Spain and studying the works of Diego Velázquez, the brushwork reminded him constantly of the "square touch" of Raeburn. Scottish physician and writer John Brown wrote that Raeburn "never fails in giving a likeness at once vivid, unmistakable and pleasing. He paints the truth, and he paints it with love".

Raeburn has been described as a "famously intuitive" portrait painter. He was unusual amongst many of his contemporaries, such as Reynolds, in the extent of his philosophy of painting directly from life; he made no preliminary sketches. This attitude partly explains the often coarse modelling and clashing colour combinations he employed, in contrast to the more refined style of Thomas Gainsborough and Reynolds. However these qualities and those mentioned above anticipate many of the later developments in painting of the 19th century from romanticism to Impressionism.

Sir Henry Raeburn died in St Bernard's House  Stockbridge, Edinburgh. He is buried in St. Cuthbert's churchyard against the east wall (the monument erected by Raeburn in advance) but also has a secondary memorial in the Church of St John the Evangelist, Edinburgh.

His studio on York Place was taken over by the artist Colvin Smith.

Subjects
Raeburn made more than a thousand paintings spanning 50 years. His subjects include:

Rev Robert Dickson
Sir George Abercromby, 4th Baronet
Countess of Aboyne, (Lady Mary Douglas, daughter of James, fourteenth Earl of Morton)
Dr Alexander Adam
Robert Adam
Mrs Robert Adam
Archibald Alison
Alexander Allan
David Anderson
Sir David Baird
Mrs Henry Balfour (Jane Elliot)
Lady Belhaven
Mrs George Bell
Mrs E Bethune
The Binning children
Hugh Blair
Mrs Irvine J Boswell
Helen Boyle
Andrew Buchanon
John Campbell of John Campbell Snr & Co.
Colonel Alexander Campbell of Possil
Mrs Alexander Campbell of Possil
Sir Duncan Campbell, Scots Guards
Master John Campbell of Saddell
Rev. Alexander Carlyle
Alexander Carre of Cavers
Master Cathcart
Sir Francis Leggatt Chantrey
Charles Christie
Miss Jean Christie
John Clerk, Lord Eldin
Mrs Jean Cockburn Ross
Jacobina Copland
William Creech
John Crichton-Stuart, 2nd Marquess of Bute
James Cruikshank
Mrs James Cruikshank
John Cuninghame of Craigends
Mrs Alexander Dirom, (Anne Fotheringham)
Lady Harriet Don, with her son
Lord Douglas (Earl of Home), as a student
Elizabeth Douglas of Brigton (née Graham)
Margaret Douglas, of Brigton, afterwards Mrs. Hunter, of Burnside
Rev. Robert Douglas, D.D., of Galashiels; died 1820
The Drummond children
George Duff
James Duff, 4th Earl Fife
Norwich Duff
Henry Dundas, 1st Viscount Melville
Thomas Elder (Lord Provost of Edinburgh)
Lady Elibank
William Fairlie
Archibald Farquharson of Finzean
Robert Fergusson and his brother Lieutenant-General Sir Ronald Fergusson, "The Archers" (Royal Company of Archers)
William Forbes of Callendar (1756–1823), coppersmith and landowner
Mrs Gevine
Eleanor Margaret Gibson-Carmichael
Karl Ludwig Giesecke
William Glendonwyn
Mrs Glendowyn and her daughter Mary
Niel Gow
John Gray of Carntyne
Mrs James Gregory (Isabella McLeod)
Mrs Elizabeth Hamilton (1757–1816), writer and educationalist
Major James Lee Harvey, Gordon Highlanders
Thomas Robert Hay, 11th Earl of Kinnoull
Captain Hay of Spot
Mrs Andrew Hay (Elizabeth Robinson)
Mrs Alexander Henderson
Principal George Hill of St Andrews
Mrs George Hill
John Home
The Rt Hon Charles Hope-Weir
Hugh Hope
Thomas Charles Hope, physician and chemist
Francis Horner, political economist
Dr James Hutton, geologist
Captain Charles Inglis, naval officer
Sir Patrick Inglis, 5th Baronet of Sunnyside
John Jameson, founder of Jameson Irish whiskey, and his wife Margaret Haig
Francis Jeffrey, Lord Jeffrey
John Johnstone, Betty Johnstone and Miss Wedderburn
Mrs Johnston of Straiton
Mrs Johnstone of Baldovie
Dr Colin Lauder (1750–1831), FRCS, & Burgess of Edinburgh
Zepherina Loughnan, Mrs Henry Veitch of Eliock
William Macdonald of St Martin's
Colonel Alexander Ranaldson MacDonell of Glengarry (1771–1828)
Allan MacDougall WS of Gallanach and Hayfield
Lt. Gen. General Hay MacDowall
Mrs George Mackay of Bighouse (Louisa Campbell)
Henry Mackenzie
Francis MacNab, The MacNab
Robert Macqueen, Lord Braxfield (1722–1799), Lord Justice-Clerk 1798
George Malcolm
Mrs Malcolm
Mrs Hugh Smyth Mercer (née Wilson)
Captain Patrick Miller
Robert Scott Moncrieff
Alexander Monro
Sir James Montgomery, 2nd Baronet of Stanhope
Thomas Mure of Warriston
Sir William Nairne, Lord Dunsinane, 5th Baronet of Nairne 
Sir William Napier, Baronet
Lord Newton
Rev. Principal Nicoll, D.D.
Mrs George Paterson of Huntly Castle
Mrs James Paterson
The Patterson children
John Playfair
Henry Raeburn
Lady Raeburn
Miss Davidson Reid
John Rennie the Elder, engineer
Professor William Richardson
William Robertson
Adam Rolland of Gask
Daniel Rutherford
Colonel Francis James Scott
Sir Walter Scott, 1st Bt
Alexander Shaw
Mrs Simpson
Sir John Sinclair, 1st Baronet
Andrew Spottiswoode
Dugald Stewart
Mrs Anne Stewart
Lieutenant General William Stuart (1778–1837) 
John Swinton, Lord Swinton
John Tait and his grandson
John Tait of Harvieston
Rev John Thomson (1778–1840) of Duddingston
Eliza Tod of Drygrange (née Pringle)
Lady Anne Torphicen
Captain Willian Tytler
Miss Eleanor Urquhart
James Usher of Toftfield
Rev Robert Walker (1755–1808) Skating on Duddingston Loch
Dr Wardrop of Torbane Hill
Rev Sir Henry Moncrieff Wellwood
Hugh William Williams
Lord Woodhouselee
Dr Rev David Johnston (1934 - 1824) Founder of Edinburgh Asylum for the Industrious Blind (now Royal Blind)

Notes

Bibliography
Andrew, William Raeburn. Life of Sir Henry Raeburn, R. A. (London: W. H. Allen & co., 1886).
Armstrong, Sir W. Sir Henry Raeburn (London, 1901.)
Masters in Art, volume 6 (Boston, 1905) p. 423 ff.
 Coltman, V. (2013). Henry Raeburn's Portraits of Distant Sons in the Global British Empire. Art Bulletin, 95(2), 294–311.
Clouston, R. S. Sir Henry Raeburn (London: G. Newnes, 1907).
Caw, James Lewis. Raeburn (London, T. C. and E. C. Jack, 1909) – with colour plates of his paintings.
Greig, James. Sir Henry Raeburn: His Life and Works (London: "The Connoisseur", 1911)
Macmillan, Duncan (1984), Scottish Painting: Ramsay to Raeburn, in Parker, Geoffrey (ed.), Cencrastus No. 17, Summer 1984, pp. 25 – 29,

External links

 
Works in the National Galleries of Scotland
Gallery of works by Henry Raeburn
Profile on Royal Academy of Arts Collections

1756 births
1823 deaths
18th-century Scottish painters
Scottish male painters
19th-century Scottish painters
Artists from Edinburgh
People educated at George Heriot's School
Fellows of the Royal Society of Edinburgh
Members of the Royal Company of Archers
People of the Scottish Enlightenment
Royal Scottish Academicians
Scottish jewellers
Scottish knights
Scottish portrait painters
Royal Academicians
Knights Bachelor